University College of Engineering (UCE), located near Thodupuzha, is an institute of engineering and technology, run and managed by the Centre for Professional and Advanced Studies (CPAS), established by the Government of Kerala. UCE offers both bachelor's and master's degree courses. The institute started functioning in 1996 at Thodupuzha and was later moved to its own campus at Muttom in May 2002.

History 
University College of Engineering was inaugurated on 29 October 1996 by the then Kerala Minister for Education and Work, Shri.P. J. Joseph, in Thodupuzha. The college started functioning with three departments - Computer Science, Electronics and Communication and Polymer Technology. In May 2002, when the college was shifted to its own campus in Muttom, with the addition of two more departments - Information Technology and Electrical and Electronics. Later in 2007, MTech course in Applied Electronics started to be offered in the campus.

Campus 
The college campus is located in a 25.6 -acre land near Muttom, 8 km from Thodupuzha, 52 km from Kottayam Railway Station, 60 km from Alwaye Railway Station, 59 km from Cochin International Airport, by the side of State Highway No 33.

Departments

Computer Science and Engineering 
This course teaches hardware and software fields, with prominence on the software sector. Other than the final semester main project, the syllabus includes seminars and two design studio lab in the sixth and seventh Semester. The course aims at making its students capable to face the challenges in the fast-growing information technology industry. The core of the course includes subjects like Data structures, Operating systems, Language processors, Algorithm analysis and Design, Computer Architecture, Computer H/W and Peripherals, Programming Languages and Theory of computation.

Electronics and Communication Engineering 
The Department of Electronics and Communication Engineering maintains an industry-institution interaction. The curriculum includes electives like Computer Networking, Information Theory and Coding.

Polymer Engineering 
The BTech Polymer Engineering course was initiated for the requirements of the industrial sector giving equal emphasis for the study of rubber and plastic. The students are professionally trained through in-plant training in various industries in and out of the state, thereby nourishing themselves with the skill and expertise..

Information Technology 
IT Department was started in 2002 as part of the college's expansion program.

Electrical and Electronics Engineering 
Electrical and Electronics Engineering (EEE) Department was started in 2002 as part of the college's expansion programme.

References

External links
 

Engineering colleges in Kerala
Colleges affiliated to Mahatma Gandhi University, Kerala
Universities and colleges in Idukki district
Educational institutions established in 1996
1996 establishments in Kerala